Anne de Carbuccia is an environmental artist, photographer, film director and world traveler.

Biography 

Anne de Carbuccia was a student of anthropology and art history at Columbia University. During her studies she developed her interest in the concept of human beings as a new geological force: Anthropocene.

Since then she has been traveling the world to develop her work that documents the relationship between mankind and the environment.

She lives and works between Milano and New York City

Major work 
One Planet One Future is Anne de Carbuccia's ongoing artistic project that documents human caused threats to the environment.

On her numerous expeditions, Anne de Carbuccia travels to powerfully document fast disappearing environments, animal species and cultures.

Her work is both a reminder of the urgency to change individual behaviors and a plea to re-imagine the future.

Her exhibition at the Museum of Oceanography in Montecarlo- WATER AT DUSK- in January 2016 was a precursor to a larger art event that opened on September of the same year at the Westbeth Art Gallery in New York.

One Planet One Future is a series of photographs and videos documenting Anne de Carbuccia's on-site installation: the "TimeShrines"

Main themes are:
 Water
 Endangered species
 Endangered environments
 Endangered cultures

In 2016 Anne de Carbuccia established the One Planet One Future Foundation. Anne de Carbuccia has also written and directed One Ocean, a short film that had its world
premiere at the 75th Venice International Film Festival in September 2018.

Her new feature-length documentary film, Earth Protectors, will be released in 2023. From Siberia to the Amazon her narrative recounts the stories and the diversity of seven young Earth Protectors that are living on the front lines of our changing planet. The film tells us that we need to adapt as a species to the Anthropocene and that everyone can choose to become a positive geological force.

Exhibitions 
One Planet One future exhibitions are organized around the world and are open to the public free of charge.

Latest exhibitions:
 Florence, Brun Fine Art - Palazzo Larderel - One Planet One Future - Jun 11 to Jun 30, 2019
London, Brun Fine Art – One Planet One Future – Sep 28 to Nov 15, 2018
Naples, Castel dell'Ovo – One Planet One Future – Jun 23 to Sept 30, 2018 
Moscow, Museum of Modern Art – One Planet One Future – Jun 21 to Sept 10, 2017
 Milano, Ventura Lambrate – One Planet One Future – Mar 30 to Apr 12, 2017
 New York, Westbeth Art Foundation – One Planet One Future – Sep 16 to Nov 21, 2016
 Monaco, Museum of Oceanography – Water at Dusk – Jan 30 to Feb 29, 2016

References

External links 
 

Environmental artists
1968 births
American artists
Living people